Misoprostol is a synthetic prostaglandin medication used to prevent and treat stomach and duodenal ulcers, induce labor, cause an abortion, and treat postpartum bleeding due to poor contraction of the uterus. It is taken by mouth when used to prevent gastric ulcers in people taking NSAIDs. For abortions it is used by itself and with mifepristone or methotrexate. By itself, effectiveness for abortion is between 66% and 90%. For labor induction or abortion, it is taken by mouth, dissolved in the mouth, or placed in the vagina. For postpartum bleeding it may also be used rectally.

Common side effects include diarrhea and abdominal pain. It is pregnancy category X meaning that it is known to result in negative outcomes for the fetus if taken during pregnancy. In rare cases, uterine rupture may occur. It is a prostaglandin analogue—specifically, a synthetic prostaglandin E1 (PGE1).

Misoprostol was developed in 1973. It is on the World Health Organization's List of Essential Medicines. It is available as a generic medication.

Medical uses

Ulcer prevention
Misoprostol is used for the prevention of NSAID-induced gastric ulcers. It acts upon gastric parietal cells, inhibiting the secretion of gastric acid by G-protein coupled receptor-mediated inhibition of adenylate cyclase, which leads to decreased intracellular cyclic AMP levels and decreased proton pump activity at the apical surface of the parietal cell. Because other classes of drugs, especially H2-receptor antagonists and proton pump inhibitors, are more effective for the treatment of acute peptic ulcers, misoprostol is only indicated for use by people who are both taking NSAIDs and are at high risk for NSAID-induced ulcers, including the elderly and people with ulcer complications. Misoprostol is sometimes coprescribed with NSAIDs to prevent their common adverse effect of gastric ulceration (e.g., with diclofenac in Arthrotec).

However, even in the treatment of NSAID-induced ulcers, omeprazole proved to be at least as effective as misoprostol, but was significantly better tolerated, so misoprostol should not be considered a first-line treatment. Misoprostol-induced diarrhea and the need for multiple daily doses (typically four) are the main issues impairing compliance with therapy.

Labor induction
Misoprostol is commonly used for labor induction. It causes uterine contractions and the ripening (effacement or thinning) of the cervix. It can be less expensive than the other commonly used ripening agent, dinoprostone.

Oxytocin has long been used as the standard agent for labor induction, but does not work well when the cervix is not yet ripe. Misoprostol also may be used in conjunction with oxytocin.

Between 2002 and 2012, a misoprostol vaginal insert was studied, and was approved in the EU. It was not approved for use in the United States, and the US FDA still considers cervical ripening and labor induction to be outside of the approved uses for misoprostol.

Myomectomy
When administered prior to myomectomy in women with uterine fibroids, misoprostol reduces operative blood loss and requirement of blood transfusion.

Abortion
Misoprostol is used either alone or in conjunction with another medication (mifepristone or methotrexate) for medical abortions as an alternative to surgical abortion. Medical abortion has the advantage of being less invasive, and more autonomous, self-directed, and discreet. It is preferred by some women because it feels more "natural," as the drugs induce a miscarriage. It is also more easily accessible in places where abortion is illegal. The World Health Organization provides clear guidelines on the use, benefits and risks of misoprostol for abortions.

Misoprostol is most effective when it is used in combination with methotrexate or mifepristone (RU-486). Mifepristone blocks signaling by progesterone, causing the uterine lining to degrade, the blood vessels of the cervix and uterusto dilate and causing uterine contraction, similar to a menstrual period, which causes the embryo to detach from the uterine walls. Misoprostol then dilates the cervix and induces muscle contractions which clear the uterus. Misoprostol alone is less effective (typically 88% up to eight-weeks gestation). It is not inherently unsafe if medically supervised, but 1% of women will have heavy bleeding requiring medical attention, some women may have ectopic pregnancy, and the 12% of pregnancies that continue after misoprostol failure are more likely to have birth defects and are usually followed up with a more effective method of abortion.

Most large studies recommend a protocol for the use of misoprostol in combination with mifepristone. Together they are effective in around 95% for early pregnancies. Misoprostol alone may be more effective in earlier gestation. WHO guidelines recommend for pregnancies up to 12 weeks to use 12 tablets of 200 mcg (micrograms). The woman should put 4 tablets of misoprostol under the tongue or far up the vagina and let them dissolve for 30 minutes. The woman should wait 3 hours and repeat with 4 pills under the tongue or in the vagina for 30 minutes. She should wait 3 hours and repeat once more. It works in 90% after first attempt and, in case of failure, the attempt may be repeated after a minimum of 3 days.

Misoprostol can also be used to dilate the cervix in preparation for a surgical abortion, particularly in the second trimester (either alone or in combination with laminaria stents). Vaginal misoprostol can also be used to facilitate intrauterine device insertion after previous insertion failure.

Misoprostol by mouth is the least effective treatment for producing complete abortion in a period of 24 hours due to the liver's first-pass effect which reduces the bioavailability of the misoprostol. Vaginal and sublingual routes result in greater efficacy and extended duration of action because these routes of administration allow the drug to be directly absorbed into circulation by bypassing the liver first-pass effect.

Hematocrit or Hb tests and Rh testing are recommended before use for abortion confirmation of pregnancy. Following use, it is recommended that people attend a follow-up visit 2 weeks after treatment. If used for treatment of complete abortion, a pregnancy test, physical examination of the uterus, and ultrasound should be performed to ensure success of treatment. Surgical management is possible in the case of failed treatment.

Early pregnancy loss
Misoprostol may be used to complete a miscarriage or missed abortion when the body does not expel the embryo or fetus on its own. Compared to no medication or placebo, it could decrease the time to complete expulsion. Use of a single dose of misoprostol vaginally or buccally is preferred, with additional doses as needed. It also can be used in combination with mifepristone, with a similar regimen to medical abortion.

Misoprostol is regularly used in some Canadian hospitals for labour induction for fetal deaths early in pregnancy, and for termination of pregnancy for fetal anomalies. A low dose is used initially, then doubled for the remaining doses until delivery. In the case of a previous Caesarian section, however, lower doses are used.

Postpartum bleeding
Misoprostol is also used to prevent and treat post-partum bleeding. Orally administered misoprostol was marginally less effective than oxytocin. The use of rectally administered misoprostol is optimal in cases of bleeding; it was shown to be associated with lower rates of side effects compared to other routes. Rectally administered misoprostol was reported in a variety of case reports and randomised controlled trials. However, it is inexpensive and thermostable (thus does not require refrigeration like oxytocin), making it a cost-effective and valuable drug to use in the developing world. A randomised control trial of misoprostol use found a 38% reduction in maternal deaths due to post partum haemorrhage in resource-poor communities. Misoprostol is recommended due to its cost, effectiveness, stability, and low rate of side effects. Oxytocin must also be given by injection, while misprostol can be given orally or rectally for this use, making it much more useful in areas where nurses and physicians are less available.

Insertion of intrauterine contraceptive device
In women with prior caesarean section or prior failure of insertion of an intrauterine contraceptive device, pre-procedure administration of misoprostol reduces the rate of failure of insertion of intrauterine contraceptive device. However, due to a higher rate of adverse effects, routine use of misoprostol for this purpose in other women is not supported by the data.

Other
For cervical ripening in advance of endometrial biopsy to reduce the need for use of a tenaculum or cervical dilator.

There is limited evidence supporting the use of misoprostol for the treatment of trigeminal neuralgia in patients with multiple sclerosis.

Adverse effects
The most commonly reported adverse effect of taking misoprostol by mouth for the prevention of stomach ulcers is diarrhea. In clinical trials, an average 13% of people reported diarrhea, which was dose-related and usually developed early in the course of therapy (after 13 days) and was usually self-limiting (often resolving within 8 days), but sometimes (in 2% of people) required discontinuation of misoprostol.

The next most commonly reported adverse effects of taking misoprostol by mouth for the prevention of gastric ulcers are: abdominal pain, nausea, flatulence, headache, dyspepsia, vomiting, and constipation, but none of these adverse effects occurred more often than when taking placebos. In practice, fever is almost universal when multiple doses are given every 4 to 6 hours.

There are increased side effects with sublingual or oral misoprostol, compared to a low dose (400 ug) vaginal misoprostol. However, low dose vaginal misoprostol was linked with low complete abortion rate. The study concluded that sublingually administered misoprostol dosed at 600 ug or 400 ug had greater instances of fever and diarrhea due to its quicker onset of action, higher peak concentration and bioavailability in comparison to vaginal or oral misoprostol.

For the indication of medical abortion, bleeding and cramping is commonly experienced after administration of misoprostol. Bleeding and cramping is likely to be greater than that experienced with menses, however, emergency care is advised if bleeding is excessive.

Misoprostol should not be taken by pregnant women with wanted pregnancies to reduce the risk of NSAID-induced gastric ulcers because it increases uterine tone and contractions in pregnancy, which may cause partial or complete abortions, and because its use in pregnancy has been associated with birth defects.

All cervical ripening and induction agents can cause uterine hyperstimulation, which can negatively affect the blood supply to the fetus and increases the risk of complications such as uterine rupture. Concern has been raised that uterine hyperstimulation that occurs during a misoprostol-induced labor is more difficult to treat than hyperstimulation during labors induced by other drugs.  Because the complications are rare, it is difficult to determine if misoprostol causes a higher risk than do other cervical ripening agents. One estimate is that it would require around 61,000 people enrolled in randomized controlled trials to detect a difference in serious fetal complications and about 155,000 people to detect a difference in serious maternal complications.

Contraindications
It is recommended that medical treatment for missed abortion with misoprostol should only be considered in people without the following contraindications: suspected ectopic pregnancy, use of non-steroidal drugs, signs of pelvic infections or sepsis, unstable hemodynamics, known allergy to misoprostol, previous caesarean section, mitral stenosis, hypertension, glaucoma, bronchial asthma, and remote areas without a hospital nearby.

Pharmacology

Mechanism of action
Misoprostol, a prostaglandin analogue, binds to myometrial cells to cause strong myometrial contractions leading to expulsion of tissue. This agent also causes cervical ripening with softening and dilation of the cervix. Misoprostol binds to and stimulates prostaglandin EP2 receptors, prostaglandin EP3 receptor and prostaglandin EP4 receptor but not Prostaglandin EP1 receptor and therefore is expected to have a more restricted range of physiological and potentially toxic actions than prostaglandin E2 or other analogs which activate all four prostaglandin receptors.

Society and culture
In August 2000, a letter from G.D. Searle, LLC, the inventor of the drug, generated controversy by warning against its use by pregnant women because of its ability to induce abortion, citing reports of maternal and fetal deaths when it was used to induce labor. The American College of Obstetricians and Gynecologists holds that substantial evidence supports the use of misoprostol for induction of labor, a position it reaffirmed in response to the Searle letter. It is on the World Health Organization's List of Essential Medicines.

The largest medical malpractice award of nearly $70 million was awarded due to the misuse of an alternative dose form misoprostol to induce labor in a California hospital. At the directive of the Health Management Organization that ran the hospital, nurses had administered a pregnant woman the form of misopristol used to treat ulcers to induce labor in order to save cost over the formulation approved for induction of labor, despite warnings from the regulators and the manufacturer itself this use. The use of this higher dosage formulation stimulated overly forceful labor contractions, compromizing blood flow to the fetus, causing it to suffer a lack of oxygen that caused developmental problems for her.

A vaginal form of the medication is sold in the EU under the names Misodel and Mysodelle for use in labor induction.

Black market
Misoprostol is used for self-induced abortions in Brazil, where black market prices exceed US$100 per dose. Illegal medically unsupervised misoprostol abortions in Brazil are associated with a lower complication rate than other forms of illegal self-induced abortion, but are still associated with a higher complication rate than legal, medically supervised surgical and medical abortions. Failed misoprostol abortions are associated with birth defects in some cases. Low-income and immigrant populations in New York City have also been observed to use self-administered misoprostol to induce abortions, as this method is much cheaper than a surgical abortion (about $2 per dose). The drug is readily available in Mexico. Use of misoprostol has also increased in Texas in response to increased regulation of abortion providers. Following the United States Supreme Court decision of Dobbs v. Jackson Women's Health Organization, many states restricted access to legal abortion services, including medication abortion using misoprostol. As a result of these restrictions, it was reported that there was an increase in self-managed abortions by women in the United States. Many women purchased the pills from overseas online pharmacies or obtained misoprostol from Mexico.

References

External links 
 
 
 

Abortifacients
Carboxylate esters
Diols
Gastroenterology
Gynaecology
Ketones
Methods of abortion
Methyl esters
Prostaglandins
World Health Organization essential medicines
Wikipedia medicine articles ready to translate